Minuartia krascheninnikovii is a species of flowering plant in the sandwort genus Minuartia, family Caryophyllaceae, native to East European Russia. It is found in the petrophytic steppes of the southern Ural mountains.

References

krascheninnikovii
Endemic flora of Russia
Flora of East European Russia
Plants described in 1937